William Bingham (March 8, 1752February 7, 1804) was an American statesman from Philadelphia. He was a delegate for Pennsylvania to the Continental Congress from 1786 to 1788 and served in the United States Senate from 1795 to 1801. Bingham was one of the wealthiest men in the United States during his lifetime, and was considered to be the richest person in the U.S. in 1780.

Early life
William Bingham was born on March 8, 1752, in Philadelphia. He graduated from the College of Philadelphia (now the University of Pennsylvania) in 1768.

Philadelphia Society
Bingham first travelled to Europe in 1773 and, upon, returning to America joined the Philadelphia Society.  Sent by the Committee of Secret Correspondence to Martinico (today's Martinique), to reside ostensibly as a merchant and to establish communications through that colony with Silas Deane, the committee's agent in France. He departed America aboard the frigate Reprisal on July 3, 1776. During his voyages, he established links with French merchants at Martinique, captured several British ships, and returned in 1777 to America with several full loads of munitions, guns, and other vital goods necessary for the fighting of a war.

Business interests

Toward the end of the American Revolution, Bingham was regarded as the richest man in the United States. He had made his fortune through joint ownership of privateers and trading. He became a major land developer, purchasing lands in upstate New York (present-day Binghamton) and 2 million acres (8,000 km2) in Maine (later known as the Bingham Purchase). He helped broker the Louisiana Purchase with Francis Baring and Henry Hope. Their agent Alexander Baring married his daughter Anne.

He was the founder and the first president of the Philadelphia and Lancaster Turnpike.

Bingham was director of several other enterprises.   He maintained shipping ventures after the Revolutionary war, through his mercantile house Bingham, Inglis, and Gilmore. He was a leading member of the Pennsylvania Society for the Encouragement of Manufactures and Useful Arts and donated a Philadelphia property to be converted into a textile factory.

Mounted general
During the 1780s, Bingham marshaled the Second Troop of Philadelphia Light Horse, an outfit of 50 dragoons. They were glamorously clad and saw little action. William Jackson was first major and later became Bingham's land agent. Bingham escorted President-elect George Washington through Pennsylvania with his troop on his April 1789 journey from Valley Forge to New York City to assume the presidency.

Bingham was elected to the American Philosophical Society in 1787.

Politics

During the provisional government of the United States at Philadelphia, he wrote the by-laws for the national Bank of North America.  He saw the national debt as beneficial in that it attracted interest into the affairs of the government.  During the first presidency, Treasurer Alexander Hamilton sought Bingham as his mentor in managing taxes, tariffs, and in constructing a national bank.

Speaker of Pennsylvania House
In America, he represented Pennsylvania as a delegate to the Continental Congress from 1786 to 1788. In 1790 and 1791 he was elected to the Pennsylvania House of Representatives, serving as its first speaker in 1791.  He oversaw development of the land during a fledgling period of America as a member of the Society of Roads and Inland Navigation, where he worked closely with Albert Gallatin of western Pennsylvania.  He later served in the Pennsylvania State Senate from 1793 through 1794.  He built roads and a bridge from Philadelphia to Lancaster, Pennsylvania called the Lancaster Pike.

U.S. Senator
By 1795, he was elected to the United States Senate where he served as a Federalist and Nationalist while it was originally at Philadelphia, but he left for England in 1801 when his wife had taken ill. In the midst of public debate and dissent focused on the Jay Treaty he was subjected to political violence in Philadelphia in the summer of 1795. He was an active supporter of John Adams and when Adams was elected president, Bingham served as the Senate's President pro tempore in the Fourth Congress. On March 4, 1797, with the start of the Fifth Congress he administered the oath of office to Vice President Thomas Jefferson.
He was criticized by Jeffersonian politicians for "extravagance, ostentation and dissipation".  In 1813, nearly ten years after his death, John Quincy Adams said that the Presidency, the Capital and the Country had been governed by Bingham and his family connections.

The several Bingham estates were renowned for hosting many prominent aristocrats from Europe as well as Federalist meetings.  At the Bingham estate, Federalists agreed to hold preliminary votings before propositions were brought before Congress publicly, thus creating unanimity among party lines.

Binghamton
He was also a land surveyor, and looked to develop areas currently a part of Southern New York, and Northern Pennsylvania.  One of his prime prospects was at the confluence of the Chenango River and Susquehanna River.  Judge Joshua Whitney Jr., settler and Bingham's  agent, called this town Binghamton to honor him.  Furthermore, Binghamton's resident university Binghamton University recognizes Bingham through the naming of Bingham Hall.

Family
He married Anne Willing, daughter of Thomas Willing, President of the First Bank of the United States, and they had two daughters and a son.

 Ann Louisa Bingham (1782–1848). In 1798, she married Alexander Baring, 1st Baron Ashburton. They were the parents of nine children.
 Maria Matilda Bingham (1783–1849), who, at the age of 15, was briefly married to a French aristocrat, Jacques Alexandre, Comte de Tilly. Afterwards she married her sister's brother-in-law, Henry Baring. They were the parents of five children.  Maria and Henry were divorced in 1824; she married the Marquis de Blaisel in 1826.
 William Bingham (1800–1852), who married Marie-Charlotte Chartier de Lotbinière (1805-1866), Seigneuresse de Rigaud, in 1822. She was the second of the three daughters and heiresses of Michel-Eustache-Gaspard-Alain Chartier de Lotbinière, by his second wife Mary, daughter of Captain John Munro. They lived in Montreal, Paris and London; and were the parents of six children. William Bingham settled in England and died in Kent in 1852.

Although his wife and two daughters factored prominently in the social affairs of American politics, Bingham's wife Anne died while his only son William was one year old. William Sr. left William Jr. to grow up in America with his grandfather Thomas Willing.

Bingham died on February 7, 1804, in Bath, England and is interred in Bath Abbey.  His estate remained in the family until the death of William Alexander Baring Bingham (1858-1915) but it was not settled until 1964.

Portraits
Bingham commissioned artist Gilbert Stuart to paint the Lansdowne portrait, a 1796 full-length portrait of President George Washington that became a gift to Lord Lansdowne. As British Prime Minister, Lansdowne had secured a peaceful end to the American Revolutionary War, and the portrait was commissioned soon after the American approval of the Jay Treaty. Stuart also painted portraits of Bingham, his wife and children.

See also
 Speaker of the Pennsylvania House of Representatives
 List of wealthiest historical figures
 List of richest Americans in history

References

Further reading
Robert C. Alberts, The Golden Voyage: The Life and Times of William Bingham, 1969, Houghton Mifflin.

External links

Archival Collections
 Guide to the Land Grant to William Bingham, Esq., for Property in Lycoming County from Thomas Mifflin, Governor of Pennsylvania. Special Collections and Archives, The UC Irvine Libraries, Irvine, California.

Other

Biography at Virtualology.com
Biography and portrait at the University of Pennsylvania
 The William Bingham Correspondence , including letters from 1791 to 1803, are available for research use at the Historical Society of Pennsylvania.
The Political Graveyard

1752 births
1804 deaths
Politicians from Philadelphia
People of colonial Pennsylvania
American people of English descent
Continental Congressmen from Pennsylvania
Pennsylvania Federalists
Federalist Party United States senators from Pennsylvania
Presidents pro tempore of the United States Senate
Speakers of the Pennsylvania House of Representatives
Pennsylvania state senators
Colonial American merchants
18th-century American businesspeople
History of Broome County, New York
University of Pennsylvania alumni
Burials in Somerset
Members of the American Philosophical Society